Tiril Gunther Merg (born 2 September 1993) is a Norwegian handball player for Larvik HK.

References 
 

Norwegian female handball players
Expatriate handball players
Norwegian expatriate sportspeople in Denmark
1993 births
Living people
Sportspeople from Bærum